Marozzi is a surname. Notable people with the surname include:

Eli Marozzi (1913–1999), Italian-born American sculptor, ceramist, teacher, and illustrator
Fabio Marozzi (born 1967), Argentinian footballer
Justin Marozzi (born 1970), English journalist, historian, and travel writer
Marco Marozzi (born 1999), Italian footballer